Alpha Bravo Charlie (Urdu: الفا براوو چارلی) is an action and thriller Pakistani drama, produced by ISPR and directed by Pakistani drama and film director Shoaib Mansoor.

It is a sequel to 1991 TV series Sunehray Din (Golden Days) with somewhat different cast. The series ran on PTV from May till July 1998. The last shooting was completed at Pakistan Military Academy, Kakul on 4 December 1997. The drama was produced by PTV Lahore centre and Shoman Productions.

The events in the drama involve romance and comedy, while reflecting the Pakistan Army's operational involvement in the Bosnian War and Siachen conflict.

Story 
The drama is based on the life and times of three characters  — Faraz, Kashif, and Gulsher also known as Alpha Bravo Charlie.
The drama starts when the three friends have just passed out from PMA (Pakistan Military Academy) and enter the army as officers. Faraz enters first, and he comes in with his brand new Mercedes car which his father (a very rich landlord) gifted him for winning the sword of honour. He is bashed for this, and he is even fooled by the batman, who happens to be the Major. The day after, Kashif comes in as well and he is also fooled by the batman. But Kashif already knew because of his father who was a General in the army. A couple of days later, Gulsher joins as well. The three slowly get settled down into the army. In the 2nd episode, when Gulsher takes the seat of the Adjutant, he gets 2 calls from the same girl who is claiming that the call mistakenly goes to this number, and she is trying to reach another number. Gulsher tries to flirt with her and says if you want to talk to me, just be honest. The girl didn't like this at all and tells him that she is the daughter of the General in the Army, and he will have to pray a price for this. Gulsher is very scared. He is told that the General will be meeting him at 8PM at the park. He goes there, stands there for 4 hours and eventually returns. This happens for 6 days back-to-back. In the first holidays, Faraz goes for a jog in the jogging park and sees a girl. He stops jogging, and turns around. The girl tells Faraz that she noticed what he has done. Faraz is very surprised about the facts that the girl is so bold and not shy at all. He is also very impressed, and starts liking her a little bit. The girl also told Faraz her name. Her name is Shahnaz. Faraz and Kashif are sent to Mona Depot, to get a horse-riding course. At a nearby mansion, Faraz sees the same girl. Kashif is talking to the man that is with her (her adoptive father) and Faraz asks him how he knows them. Kashif tells him that they are his family friend. Back to Gulsher, the girl calls for him again, and he insists to meet her so he can apologise. They meet, and it is revealed that the girl that Gulsher had been talking to on the phone, is the same girl that Faraz is in love with: Shahnaz. Shahnaz take Gulsher to a restaurant because she realises that Gulsher is a decent guy, and he didn't mean to flirt with her. But Gulsher can't afford the food and it will hurt his pride if he lets a girl pay for his food, so he runs away from the restaurant. The next morning Shahnaz calls for Gulsher again, but he is too afraid to talk to her so tells the adjutant to make an excuse. The same night, Gulsher receives a letter in which is written that he needs to be at a certain place on a certain time. He goes here, and Shahnaz appears, very angry. She was angry that he made an excuse and that the adjutant must be thinking wrong about her. She also tells Gulsher to be more confident, and not so shy. Faraz, Kashif and Gulsher are now going to be sent to another exercise. Before going, Kashif tells his father to go to Shahnaz's house and ask for her hand in marriage. At the exercise, Kashif is playing games with the tank for which he is punished. Eventually, he tells the Major he wants to leave the army because he thinks he is a misfit and he was forced to join the army anyway. But the major has other plans. Back from the exercise, Faraz gets to know from his dad that Shahnaz refused the proposal. When Faraz confronts Shahnaz, she tells him that he is Mr. Perfect, which is why she refused him. She will have pretty much no impact on his life whatsoever, because he will achieve whatever he wants to, and she wants someone who does lack things, and has flaws, so she can fix those flaws. As a joke, Faraz says: I think I have someone in mind for you, he is our Mr. Charlie. He says Gulsher. Although he meant it as a joke, Shahnaz thought it was a very good idea and tells him to talk to Gulsher about this. Gulsher and Shahnaz get married. Kashif is being sent to Siachin, and he tries his best to stop this. He takes the wives of high officers on shopping, and talks to his father who is a general. He says: I will not survive in any way. Or the enemy will kill me, or I will die of cold. But nothing works out. He goes to Siachin. Shortly after this, Gulsher gets sent to Bosnia. Kashif and Gulsher both experience a lot of adventures in their spot. When the situation gets tense at Siachin, the officers are making a plan to reach the peak to have control over the area and be prior to the enemy. Kashif comes out with an outstanding plan, and also volunteers for the mission. He and one other man get sent to the peak, but they still have to climb. While climbing, Kashif's partner gets shot. He doesn't die, but he weakens a lot. Kashif shoots the enemies. They both now go ahead to reach the top. Kashif's partner reaches the top first, and he is almost passed out when Kashif reaches him. But still he tells Kashif to proceed and let him be. Kashif moves further, and then a group of enemies come. Kashif shoots them all, and then comes back to check on this partner. He also tries to reach out to the headquarters, but nothing works. The next scene is at the Hospital, where the parents of Kashif are informed that their son has survived and that it is a miracle, but he has had awful frostbite and both his arms and legs are amputated. In the very same scene, we see Gulsher and Shahnaz's son being born. His name is Sher Jaan. In Bosnia, a very big conflict breaks out. Gulsher goes out with tanks and a couple of other men. Gulsher goes away from the tanks, where he is surrounded by Serbs. The tank explodes, and the army is informed that Gulsher has been martyred. Shahnaz is told the same. But in reality, Gulsher is caught by Serbs who want him to state lies, so they have proof against the Muslims. But Gulsher doesn't do this. In Pakistan, Shahnaz slowly gets over Gulsher's death. Her son is growing up. Kashif gets artificial arms and legs, and proceeds to serve the army. He is promoted to Major, from Captain. Faraz and Shahnaz start getting very close to each other. They open a hostel for special children. Faraz's father tells him to marry Shahnaz. Even Shahnaz's Uncle and Aunt think that Shahnaz likes Faraz. In the last episode, Shahnaz tells Faraz that she wants to marry Kashif. But Kashif refuses. When Shahnaz is convincing Kashif, her Uncle gets a phone call that Gulsher is alive. They are all very happy. In Bosnia, Gulsher finally escapes from the camp he was locked up in. While escaping, he is chased by a couple of men, and shot dead. Flash forward to 20 years later. Faraz is now Brigadier and lives with 2 daughters and his wife. Kashif is Colonel and lives with a son, a daughter and his wife. After the war in Bosnia, Shahnaz went to Bosnia in search of Gulsher. She couldn't find him.
The end.

Cast and characters

Main

 Faraz Inam as Captain / Brigadier General Faraz Ahmed: A captain in the army and son of a rich landlord in Punjab. Faraz was a confident, ambitious man — Mr Perfect who was well-built, good- looking and wealthy to go along with his excellent academic record. He owned a Mercedes, a Black C180. Ahmad, unlike his friends, was not assigned to any of the combat action.
 Captain Abdullah Mehmood as Captain / Colonel Kashif Kirmani: A third generation army officer who initially did not like being in the army but later proved himself. Kirmani was the main character responsible for providing humor through mischief. He played the first cousin to Shahnaz. 
 Colonel Qasim Khan as Captain Gulsher Khan: Mild-mannered, modest, and humble, he married Shahnaz Sher and settled in a luxurious apartment. A few days after his marriage, Khan was sent to Bosnia on a UN peacekeeping mission. While a commanding officer of his company, Khan harbored and launched a number of rescue operations to protect Bosnian Muslims held by the Serbian forces.
 Shahnaz Khawaja as Shahnaz Sher: A Cambridge-educated elementary school teacher of special children who had a straightforward personality with her own philosophy of life. Captain Gulsher Khan's wife, former love interest of Faraz and first cousin of Kashif.

Supporting characters
 Malik Ata Muhammad Khan as Faraz's father
 Brig. Tahir
 Waqar Ahmed
 Farhat Pasha
 Asmat Sufi
 Maj. Kamran
 Cadet Shujaat
 L Naik Samiullah
 Naveed Saifullah

Production

Casting
In June 2021, over 20 years after the show ended, Hadiqa Kiani revealed in an interview that she was offered the female lead in the serial but she declined due to other commitments.

See also 

 ISPR Media Productions

References

External links
TV show Alpha Bravo Charlie on IMDb website

1990s Pakistani television series
1998 Pakistani television series debuts
1998 Pakistani television series endings
Military of Pakistan in fiction
Pakistani military television series
Pakistan Television Corporation original programming
Pakistani drama television series
Television series based on actual events
Urdu-language television shows
War television series
Works about the Bosnian War
Yugoslav Wars in fiction
Inter-Services Public Relations media productions
Inter-Services Public Relations films
Indian Armed Forces in fiction
Inter-Services Public Relations dramas